Dr. Christian Troy is a fictional character played by Julian McMahon on the FX Networks series Nip/Tuck. The show revolves around McNamara/Troy, the plastic surgery practice he runs with his business partner and best friend, Sean McNamara.

Character overview

Christian Troy is initially characterized as a self-absorbed narcissist, womanizer with no qualms about using people to get what he wants. He drives flashy cars, wears Gucci suits, and frequents Miami's best nightclubs.

However, the character is eventually shown to have a vulnerable side beneath his callous exterior. In one episode, he confesses that he was molested as a child by his foster father. This early trauma destroyed his faith in a just God. In another story arc, he meets his biological mother, who tells him that he is the product of rape; she then cuts off any contact with him because he looks just like his father, her rapist, and because she does not want her "real family" to know about that part of her life.

He has had affairs with most of the series' female characters, including Sean's wife, Julia (Joely Richardson); initially unbeknownst to Sean and Christian, Julia and Sean's son, Matt (John Hensley) is, in fact, Christian's biological child, with whom he is very close. The show's first two seasons include many episodes centered on Christian's dysfunctional relationship with Kimber Henry (Kelly Carlson), a former patient whom he often manipulated and cheated on.

Role in the series
In the first season, he has a one-night stand with Gina Russo (Jessalyn Gilsig), a recovering sex addict. Gina, angered to have broken her vow of celibacy, resolves to make Christian's life miserable, and the two initiate a bitter, love/hate sexual relationship that is not resolved until the fourth season. After the one-night stand, Gina becomes pregnant and throughout the pregnancy, Christian believed he is the father. When the baby is born, however, Christian realizes he is obviously not the father since the child is half black. However, Christian takes care of and becomes the surrogate father to her son, Wilber. After trying to hire a nanny to watch his son, he begins sleeping with her. While having sex with her one night, he finds out that she had been giving Wilber cough medicine to keep the baby quiet. He immediately fires her and spends the night of his 40th birthday with his son, his birthday wish being a prayer to God to make him a good father. He later loses custody of Wilber to the boy's biological father.

In the third season, Christian is sexually assaulted by The Carver, a masked serial rapist preying on McNamara/Troy's patients. He is briefly suspected of, and arrested once for, the Carver's crimes. A distraught Christian temporarily withdraws from work, prompting Sean to bring in another surgeon, Quentin Costa (Bruno Campos). Costa involves himself in Christian's relationship with Kimber, and the two become bitter rivals; Campos is eventually revealed as the Carver. Christian almost marries Kimber, but the relationship sours after she is kidnapped by the Carver; after she is rescued, she refuses to let Christian see what the rapist had done to her face and body. She breaks off their relationship, so she can recover emotionally from her ordeal. Eventually, Kimber comes back as a Scientologist. When Kimber gets pregnant, Christian steals DNA for a paternity test, convinced he is the father.

Distressed by his apparent inability to form an intimate adult relationship, Christian entered psychotherapy with Dr. Faith Wolper (Brooke Shields) — and eventually had sex with her. Dr. Wolper also suggested that Christian's relationship block exists because he is really in love with Sean. During that time, Christian begins dreaming about having sex with Sean. She later tells Christian that she is a recovering sex addict, and realized after their tryst that she still had a problem. She then asks him to remove a tattoo an ex-lover had forced her to get as a means of degrading her. Christian eventually realizes the dreams are the result of his own personal identity crisis, and resolves his problems with Sean. He also begins an affair with Michelle Landau (Sanaa Lathan), the wife of McNamara/Troy's new owner. Soon after they meet, Christian suspects her of having a relationship with a woman named James LeBeau (Jacqueline Bisset) who is smuggling organs out of the clinic. Christian finds out that James is Michelle's former pimp and pays her off to leave Michelle and McNamara/Troy alone.

Michelle's husband, Burt (Larry Hagman), finds out about the affair from Dr. Wolper, and tries to force the two to have sex in front of him. When Burt later tries to have sex with Michelle, he has a stroke and dies after she refuses to give him his medicine. After Burt's death, Christian and Michelle get engaged, and Michelle agrees to be Wilber's adoptive mother. James does not keep her end of the bargain, however; she uses McNamara/Troy as a base of operations. Christian then finds out that James works for drug lord Escobar Gallardo (Robert LaSardo). James eventually commits suicide. He and Michelle buy Sean's stake in McNamara/Troy after Sean moves to California. Just as it seems they will live happily ever after, Christian finds out that she had been James' accomplice in the organ smuggling ring. Disgusted, he leaves her and follows Sean to California.

However, life is not easy for Christian and Sean in LA; for the first two months, they have no clients. Desperate for money, they get jobs at a reality show as consults and guest-stars. When his hair implants come in wrong, Christian has to miss his first appearance on the show; Sean, meanwhile, is a hit with the audience. Out of spite, Christian breaks a confidentiality agreement and reveals that he had performed surgery on an actress to get recognition himself. This falls flat as he is double crossed by the magazine, which does not publish his story and tells his agent about his breach of contract. He then does a porn photoshoot, attracting gay men to his office. He and Sean also operate on rival Marilyn Monroe impersonators; Christian then has a threesome with both of them. He then has sex with Julia. Christian dabbles in male prostitution after a woman mistakes him for an actual prostitute named Campbell. Afterwards, the client tells a friend, forcing Christian to give up his "night job". He decides to give religion a try after meeting a nun. When Sean's family friend Eden Lord (AnnaLynne McCord) threatens to tell Sean about his night with Julia, he solves the problem by setting her up to look like a drug addict and admitting her into rehab. She comes back while they are filming en episode of the show and reveals the truth, but Sean does not believe her, and she then tells him she lied.

Julia and Christian begin to have a relationship; when Sean eventually discovers their relationship, both admit to him that they are in love.  However, Christian is tempted to cheat on Julia yet again with Gina, who was hired temporarily as receptionist.  Oddly enough, Sean had chosen Gina for this position because Christian was the least likely to cheat with her, but the two find non-coital means to have an affair.  When Gina admits the affair to Julia and Christian meets her on the roof of his office building to serve her a restraining order, he is offered a condom by Gina.  He begins to have intercourse with her on the ledge of the roof, when Gina is thrust off the building, falling to her death.

Matt sleeps with Christian's patient Emme Lowell (Jeannine Kaspar) after Christian tries to set them up. Emme's mother Darlene (Lisa Darr) comes to LA to meet with Christian, and informs Christian that Emme is his daughter. The two immediately get a paternity test, which proves that Emme is indeed Christian's daughter. They both try to persuade Matt and Emme to break up, and in the end are successful.

Christian develops second stage breast cancer, and undergoes a mastectomy, with Sean promising to perform the reconstruction. After undergoing surgery and chemotherapy, Christian becomes very ill and Liz decides to stay with him while he recovers. Eventually, the two end up having sex, leading to them becoming a couple briefly until Christian recovers enough to resume his womanizing lifestyle. A hurt Liz quits her job at McNamara/Troy and moves back to Miami. Despite his apparent good health, Christian learns that the cancer has spread and he has six months to a year left to live. Realizing he does not want to spend what time he has left alone, he travels back to Miami and asks Liz to come back by proposing to her. Liz returns, and discovers that a large amount of medicine is missing from the storeroom. Christian admits to Liz that he stole it because he found out his cancer had returned, and he was going to use the drugs to kill himself, but changed his mind. Liz is insulted that Christian asked her to marry him so that she "could help him die" and throws the ring back at him. Later, Liz changes her mind and agrees to marry Christian after realizing he is sincere in his wish to spend what time he has left with her.

However, shortly after his wedding to Liz, he receives a phone call from his doctor telling him that his cancer is fully in remission. His results were switched with another patient's due to a computer glitch. The doctor wishes him and his new wife a long, happy life together.

In the beginning of season 6 Christian and Liz have broken up due to Christian finding out about his cancer remission. An embittered Liz sues Christian and threatens to take everything he owns. Meanwhile, Matt has taken up mime lessons, but after it tanks, Matt uses his theatrical look to hold people at (fake) gunpoint. After seeing a patient's darkness kill his own family, Liz decides to drop her case and set Christian free, wanting nothing to do with him.

Christian and Kimber marry in Season 6, but the marriage is ill-fated from the start.  Kimber is having an affair with Sean, which makes her feel extremely guilty and affects her sex life with Christian.  In order to spice things up, Christian tries to strangle her during sex, (at the suggestion of one of his surgery patients) but since she refuses to do it to him, he attempts to strangle himself in the shower and passes out. Kimber discovers him lying on the floor and comes to his aid.  He then confesses that Kimber deserves better, and that he will never be able to love her like she wants to be loved.  Though Kimber makes a last-ditch effort to save the marriage, Christian has already given up on it, which drives Kimber to drown herself by jumping off a boat.

Christian is wracked with guilt about Kimber's death; when Kimber's mother comes to town, however, he has no qualms about sleeping with her.  Kimber's ghost then appears and ridicules him.  Her ghost also appears a final time, and reveals she killed herself to escape him, and believes that Sean might do the same if he remains at McNamara/Troy.

Julia returns to town for Matt's wedding to his girlfriend Ramona (Melonie Diaz), and reveals that she is engaged, but this does not stop Christian from making moves on her, telling her he still loves her.  Julia rejects him and leaves, crushing Christian's ego.

After much thought about how his lifestyle is affecting Sean, Christian makes the decision to dissolve the partnership between them.  He tells Sean that he knows he is miserable at McNamara/Troy and that there is no reason for him to stay since Julia has taken the children to England.  Sean has become attached to Raphael, the orphan that former patient Ava Moore (Famke Janssen) left at the practice, and knowing that Sean does not want to give the baby up, Christian gets him a plane ticket to leave the country with Raphael.  Sean reluctantly agrees, and walks out of the office to see a new sign up in the foyer..."Troy/Cruz".

At the airport, the ex-partners say their goodbyes, and separate at the terminal.  Though Sean looks back, Christian keeps walking until he reaches the bar, where he meets an attractive young blonde.  Revealing the fact that he will never change, he attempts to make a move on the girl, who rejects him until he says he cannot have a drink because he has to perform surgery the next day.  She replies, "You're a doctor?", an allusion to the way Christian first met Kimber. Christian smiles and says, 'Plastic surgeon.'

References 

Nip/Tuck characters
Fictional characters from Miami
Fictional characters with cancer
Adoptee characters in television
Fictional offspring of rape
Television characters introduced in 2003
Fictional plastic surgeons
Fictional victims of child sexual abuse
Fictional victims of sexual assault

sv:Nip/Tuck#Christian Troy